The 2011 African Junior Athletics Championships were held at the University of Botswana Stadium in Gaborone, Botswana from 12 to 15 May. It was the tenth edition of the continental athletics tournament for African athletes aged 19 years or younger. Over 700 athletes from 28 countries announced their desire to participate in the event over four days of track and field competitions, which featured 22 events from men and 22 events for women.

South Africa topped the medal table with thirteen gold and silver medals. Ethiopia and Egypt both won six events, while Kenya and Nigeria rounded out the top five. Seventeen nations reached the medal table at the competition. El Mehdi Kabbachi was a double gold medallist for Morocco, winning both the men's long and triple jump competitions. Namibian thrower Charlene Engelbrecht won both her country's medals with runner-up performances in the shot put and discus.

Among the other medallists, Uganda's Annet Negesa took an 800 m/1500 m double, including a Ugandan record in the latter event. The women's Egyptian record in the high jump was broken by Besnet Moussad Mohamed, who won gold. Aynalem Eshetu of Ethiopia improved the African record to win the women's 5000 m walk. Her teammate Magiso Manedo excelled in the sprints: she won the 400 m, set an Ethiopian record to take the 200 m silver medal and anchored the 4×400 metres relay team to another national record and the bronze medal.

Outside of the medallists, strong performances came from javelin fourth-placer Adriaan Beukes, who broke the Botswana record, and Phumlile Ndzinisa of Swaziland ran Swazi records in the 200 m and 400 m finals. Further to this, Egypt's Hamada Mohamed (fourth in the 800 m) set an Egyptian junior record.

Medal summary

Men

Women

Medal table

Participation

References

IAAF reports
Jalava, Mirko (2011-05-13). Distances provide the highlights as African junior champs begin in Gaborone. IAAF. Retrieved on 2011-05-16.
Jalava, Mirko (2011-05-14). Strong 1500m and 10,000m performances in Gaborone – African Junior Champs, Day 2. IAAF. Retrieved on 2011-05-16.
Jalava, Mirko (2011-05-15). Chepkoech leads Kenyan women’s 1-2 in the 5000m in Gaborone – African Junior Champs, Day 3. IAAF. Retrieved on 2011-05-16.
Jalava, Mirko (2011-05-16). Records tumble as African Junior Champs conclude in Gaborone. IAAF. Retrieved on 2011-05-16.
Results
Official championships results from Timetronics
Jalava, Mirko. AfrC  Gaborone  BOT  12 - 15 May. Tilastopaja. Retrieved on 2011-05-16.

External links
Official website

African Junior Athletics Championships
African Junior
Athletics competitions in Botswana
2011 in Botswana sport
African Junior Athletics
21st century in Gaborone
International sports competitions hosted by Botswana
Sport in Gaborone
2011 in youth sport